The 2011–12 Serie A1 is the 93rd season of the Serie A1, Italy's premier Water polo league.

Seasons in Italian water polo competitions
Italy
Serie A1
Serie A1
2011 in water polo
2012 in water polo